Karen Jissel Reyes Hernández (born 12 February 1998) is an American-born Salvadoran footballer who plays as a forward for Club Necaxa Femenil [Liga MX Femenil] and the El Salvador women's national team.

Early life
Reyes was born and raised in Reston, Virginia to Salvadoran parents, Fausto Reyes and Norma Hernández, both from Anamorós.

High school and college career
Reyes has attended the South Lakes High School in her hometown and the Marymount University in Arlington County, Virginia.

Club career
Reyes has played for Åland United in Finland.

International career
Reyes made her senior debut for El Salvador on 19 November 2021.

See also
List of El Salvador women's international footballers

References

External links

1998 births
Living people
Citizens of El Salvador through descent
Salvadoran women's footballers
Women's association football forwards
Åland United players
El Salvador women's international footballers
Salvadoran expatriate footballers
Salvadoran expatriate sportspeople in Finland
Expatriate women's footballers in Finland
People from Reston, Virginia
Sportspeople from Fairfax County, Virginia
Soccer players from Virginia
American women's soccer players
Marymount Saints women's soccer players
American expatriate women's soccer players
American expatriate sportspeople in Finland
American sportspeople of Salvadoran descent